John Roberts (14 December 1887 – after 1915) was an English professional footballer who played in Italy between 1912 and 1916 for Milan and Modena.

References

1887 births
Year of death missing
Footballers from Liverpool
English footballers
Association football central defenders
A.C. Milan players
Modena F.C. players
English expatriate footballers
Expatriate footballers in Italy
English expatriate sportspeople in Italy